Fabian Drzyzga (born 3 January 1990) is a Polish professional volleyball player. A participant in the Olympic Games (Rio 2016, Tokyo 2020), and a two–time World Champion (2014, 2018). At the professional club level, he plays for Asseco Resovia.

Personal life
Drzyzga was born in Bordeaux, France, because of his father Wojciech, a volleyball player and member of the French volleyball team, JSA Bordeaux. His father is currently a sports commentator giving a running commentary of Polish national team and PlusLiga matches. Fabian's brother – Tomasz (born 1985) is a former volleyball player. On 3 September 2016 he married Monika Król. In March 2018 he announced via Instagram that they are expecting their first child.

Career

Clubs
He joined AZS Częstochowa in 2008. In 2012, Częstochowa won the CEV Challenge Cup after the final matches against AZS Politechnika Warszawska. In 2012 he left the club from Częstochowa and joined AZS Politechnika Warszawska. After one season he changed club and signed a contract with the Polish Champion of 2012 and 2013 – Asseco Resovia. In the 2013/2014 season, Resovia won the Polish SuperCup and a silver medal of the Polish Championship 2013/2014 after losing the final (0–3 in matches, to three wins) against PGE Skra Bełchatów. On 29 March 2015 Asseco Resovia, including Drzyzga, achieved silver medal of the 2014–15 CEV Champions League. Drzyzga was named The Best Setter of the Final Four CEV Champions League. In April 2015 he signed next two-year contract until 2017. In April 2015 he achieved his first title of Polish Champion with club from Rzeszów. In June 2017, he moved to Olympiacos.

National team
Drzyzga debuted in the Polish national team in 2010, but also represented Poland as a cadet in the past. He won a silver medal of the U19 European Championship in 2007. He was appointed for the first time to the senior national team by Daniel Castellani in 2009. Drzyzga is a bronze medalist of the 2011 European Championship. On 16 August 2014, he was appointed to the national team at World Championship held in Poland. On 21 September 2014 he won a title of the World Champion. On 27 October 2014 he received a state award granted by the Polish President of that time Bronisław Komorowski – Gold Cross of Merit for outstanding sports achievements and worldwide promotion of Poland. On 30 September 2018 Poland achieved its third title of the World Champion. Poland beat Brazil in the final 3-0 and defended the title from 2014.

Honours

Clubs
 CEV Champions League 
  2014/2015 – with Asseco Resovia
 CEV Challenge Cup
  2011/2012 – with AZS Częstochowa
  2017/2018 – with Olympiacos
 National championships
 2013/2014  Polish SuperCup, with Asseco Resovia
 2014/2015  Polish Championship, with Asseco Resovia
 2017/2018  Greek League Cup, with Olympiacos
 2017/2018  Greek Championship, with Olympiacos
 2019/2020  Russian Championship, with Lokomotiv Novosibirsk

Youth national team
 2007  CEV U19 European Championship

Individual awards
 2015: CEV Champions League – Best Setter
 2015: Polish Cup – Best Setter
 2018: Greek Championship – Best Setter
 2021: FIVB Nations League – Best Setter

State awards
 2014:  Gold Cross of Merit
 2018:  Knight's Cross of Polonia Restituta

References

External links

 
 Player profile at PlusLiga.pl 
 Player profile at Volleybox.net
 
 

1990 births
Living people
Sportspeople from Bordeaux
Polish men's volleyball players
Polish expatriate sportspeople in Greece
Expatriate volleyball players in Greece
Polish expatriate sportspeople in Russia
Expatriate volleyball players in Russia
Olympic volleyball players of Poland
Volleyball players at the 2016 Summer Olympics
Volleyball players at the 2020 Summer Olympics
Recipients of the Gold Cross of Merit (Poland)
AZS Częstochowa players
Projekt Warsaw players
Resovia (volleyball) players
Olympiacos S.C. players
Setters (volleyball)